Christen Møller (17 March 1884 – 12 February 1981) was a Danish sports shooter. He competed at the 1920 Summer Olympics and the 1936 Summer Olympics.

References

External links
 

1884 births
1981 deaths
Danish male sport shooters
Olympic shooters of Denmark
Shooters at the 1920 Summer Olympics
Shooters at the 1936 Summer Olympics
Sportspeople from Aalborg